Luigi "Gigi" Radice (15 January 1935 – 7 December 2018) was an Italian football manager and player.

A strong, tenacious, and consistent defender, he was usually deployed as a left-back. As a manager, he was known for his use of "zona mista" tactics, and his early attempts to implement "pressing" and zonal marking tactics into his teams.

Club career

Radice played in Serie A for teams such as AC Milan, Triestina and Padova. Initially a member of the Milan Youth squad, he struggled to find space in the first team; he made his Serie A debut with Milan on 25 March 1956, in a 0–0 away draw against SPAL. He made only 19 appearances in total during his first three seasons at the club, as Milan won the 1956–57 and the 1958–59 Serie A titles. He subsequently moved to Triestina and Padova to gain more playing time, where he impressed fans before being recalled to Milan. During his second stint with the club, he played a pivotal role in helping Milan to win the 1961–62 Serie A title and the 1962–63 European Cup. However, serious injuries to his knee cut his playing career short, and he retired in 1965. In total, he made 95 appearances for Milan, 75 of which came in Serie A, scoring 1 goal throughout his Milan career, which came in Serie A.

International career

Radice was also a member of the Italian squad for the World Cup in 1962, making two appearances at the tournament as Italy was eliminated in the first round; he made five appearances for Italy in total between 1961 and 1963.

Managerial career

Radice began his managerial career with Monza, winning the 1966–67 Serie C Girone A; he remained at the club from 1966 until 1971, apart from a year-long spell with Treviso between 1968–69. After his experience with Treviso he moved to Cesena, with whom he achieved the club's first promotion to Serie A in 1972–73. He made his managerial debut in Serie A the following season with Fiorentina.

After a brief time at Cagliari in 1975, Radice moved to Torino, where he became the first and only coach to lead the club to the Scudetto since the Superga tragedy, winning the title during the 1975–76 season. Radice was awarded the Seminatore d'Oro that season as the best coach in Serie A.

On 17 April 1979, he was involved in a car accident on the Autostrada dei Fiori in which former football player Paolo Barison lost his life. Radice was severely injured and hospitalised at Imperia, a 56-year-old man was also killed in the crash.  During the 1979–80 season, in February 1980, he left Turin.

In 1980–81, Radice led Bologna to a 7th-place finish despite starting the season with a 5-point penalty following the Totonero scandal. He coached Milan in the 1981–82 season, but was replaced by Italo Galbiati halfway through the season which ended with the relegation of the Rossoneri.

In 1983, he replaced Enrico Catuzzi as the manager of Bari in Serie B, coaching the Galletti for the remaining 13 games of the season. He managed Inter Milan in the 1983–84 season, then returned to Torino in 1984–85; notably achieving a second-place finish in his first season back.

In 1989 he left Torino, subsequently managing Roma and Bologna. In the 1992–93 season Fiorentina was entrusted to Radice. The team started well, and at the turn of the year was sitting in second place, having scored 15 points in the first 13 matches. However, a mid-season feud with the club's chairman Vittorio Cecchi Gori led to the departure of Radice, and Fiorentina nose-dived in the standings. They scored only 15 more points in the remaining 21 matches, and finished only 16th. The result was relegation to Serie B.

Radice later returned to Cagliari in 1993–94, and in 1995 he managed Genoa. He ended his managerial coach where he had started, in Monza, with whom he obtained promotion to Serie B in the 1996–97 season.

Personal life
On 26 April 2015, his son revealed that his father was suffering from Alzheimer's disease. Radice died on 7 December 2018.

Honours

Player
AC Milan
Serie A: 1956–57, 1958–59, 1961–62
European Cup: 1962–63

Manager
Torino
Serie A: 1975–76

Monza
Serie C (Girone A): 1966–67

Individual
Seminatore d'oro: 1975–76
AC Milan Hall of Fame
Torino F.C. Hall of Fame: 2014
Italian Football Hall of Fame: 2019

References

External links
 AC Milan.com

1935 births
2018 deaths
Sportspeople from the Metropolitan City of Milan
Italy international footballers
A.C. Milan players
U.S. Triestina Calcio 1918 players
Calcio Padova players
Serie A players
Serie B players
Italian football managers
A.C. Monza managers
A.C. Cesena managers
Torino F.C. managers
A.C. Milan managers
Inter Milan managers
A.S. Roma managers
ACF Fiorentina managers
S.S.C. Bari managers
Serie A managers
1962 FIFA World Cup players
Association football defenders
Italian footballers
Deaths from dementia in Italy
Deaths from Alzheimer's disease
Footballers from Lombardy